Hironobu (written 博信, 浩宣, 博允, 弘伸 or 裕信) is a masculine Japanese given name. Notable people with the name include:

, Japanese footballer
, Japanese prince
, Japanese singer and musician
, Japanese swimmer
, Japanese footballer
, Japanese video game designer, director and producer
, Japanese lawyer
, Japanese racing driver

Japanese masculine given names